Gnaphosa alpica is a ground spider species found in Europe, primarily found in the alpine grasslands of Switzerland and in France. Gnaphosa alpica was first described as a species by French naturalist and arachnologist Eugène Simon(1848-1924). Today, Gnaphosa alpica's range is threatened by shrinking alpine grassland habitats in Europe.

Description
Gnaphosa alpica typically measures 8.2 mm long and 2.9 mm wide. Its frontquarters are brown and its hindquarters are grey-black.

See also 
 List of Gnaphosidae species

References

External links 

Gnaphosidae
Spiders of Europe
Spiders described in 1878